Cibla is a village in Cibla Parish, Ludza Municipality in the Latgale region of Latvia.

See also 
 Cibla Parish

References

Towns and villages in Latvia
Ludza Municipality
Lyutsinsky Uyezd
Latgale